Royal Air Force Kinnell or more simply RAF Kinnell is a former Royal Air Force satellite station located near to Friockheim, Angus, Scotland.

History

The following units were here at some point:
 Satellite of No. 1 Combat Training Wing RAF (1943-44)
 Satellite of No. 1 Tactical Exercise Unit RAF (January - July 1944)
 Satellite of No. 2 Flying Instructors School (Advanced) RAF (September 1944 - July 1945)
 Relief Landing Ground of No. 9 (Pilots) Advanced Flying Unit RAF (September 1944)
 Satellite of No. 44 Maintenance Unit RAF (MU) (August 1945 - ?)
 Satellite of No. 56 Operational Training Unit RAF (March 1942 - October 1943)
 Satellite of No. 260 MU RAF (November 1945 - ?)

Current use

The site is now used as farmland.

References

Citations

Bibliography

Royal Air Force stations of World War II in the United Kingdom
Royal Air Force stations in Scotland